Jeremy B. Bash (born August 13, 1971) is an American lawyer. He was the chief of staff at the Central Intelligence Agency (2009–2011) and the U.S. Department of Defense (2011–2013) under President Barack Obama.  As a senior advisor to Leon Panetta in both roles, Bash worked on a number of key initiatives, including the creation of a new defense strategy, formation of two defense budgets, counterterrorism operations, a new cyber strategy, and a range of sensitive intelligence operations.

Bash is currently a managing director at Beacon Global Strategies LLC, which he founded with partners Philippe Reines and Andrew Shapiro in 2013. Additionally, Bash serves as national security analyst for NBC News and its cable division, MSNBC.

Early life and education
Jeremy Bash was born and raised in Arlington, Virginia to a Conservative Jewish family. Bash graduated in 1989 from the Charles E. Smith Jewish Day School. Bash graduated magna cum laude and Phi Beta Kappa from Georgetown University, where he was editor-in-chief of The Hoya, the school's student newspaper, In 1989, he was an intern for Senator Chuck Robb.  In 1998, Bash received his J.D. degree with honors from Harvard Law School, where he served as an editor of the Harvard Law Review.

Career
Following his graduation, Bash clerked for Leonie Brinkema, U.S. District Judge in the Eastern District of Virginia. Bash was admitted to the bars of Virginia, Maryland, the District of Columbia, the Eastern District of Virginia, and the Fourth Circuit Court of Appeals.

In 2000, Bash served as the national security issues director for the presidential campaign of Al Gore and Joe Lieberman. In that role, he advised the candidates, their surrogates, and staff on national security policy matters, including the Middle East peace process, counter-terrorism, non-proliferation, missile defense, and trade.

From 2001 to 2004, Bash was in private law practice with the firm O’Melveny & Myers in their Washington, DC office. His practice focused on congressional investigations, regulatory matters, and litigation. He then served as chief minority counsel on the Permanent Select Committee on Intelligence of the U.S. House of Representatives and as an aide to California Representative Jane Harman, the committee's top Democrat.

Bash was a term member of the Council on Foreign Relations. He has spoken at conferences or as part of courses for Harvard Law School, Georgetown Law School, American University, and the National War College.

Bash was interviewed by The New York Times in regard to an October 5, 2013 U.S. Special Operations Forces raid in Tripoli, Libya that resulted in the capture of Abu Anas al-Libi, a terrorist target who was indicted in the 1998 United States embassy bombings in Kenya and Tanzania. Bash also appeared as a commentator on PBS NewsHour and was interviewed on ABC World News regarding both the Tripoli raid and an aborted raid in Somalia to capture an al-Shabab commander known as Ikrimah.

In October 2020, Bash and more than 50 former intelligence officials signed a letter stating the disclosure of emails in the Hunter Biden laptop story "has the classic earmarks of a Russian information operation". There has been a diligent effort to demonstrate that the Hunter Biden laptop story is disinformation. However, NPR had to make the correction, “A previous version of this story said U.S. intelligence had discredited the laptop story. U.S. intelligence officials have not made a statement to that effect” after making the false claim that the Hunter Biden laptop story had been discredited.

In April 2022, Bash was appointed by the Senate Armed Services Committee to serve as a member of the Afghanistan War Commission, a bipartisan commission designed to study the entirety of U.S. military operations in Afghanistan from 2001 to 2021.

In other media
In 2008, a minor character based on Bash appeared in the HBO original movie Recount about the 2000 United States presidential election recount in Florida.  Bash was portrayed by Derek Cecil. Bash is portrayed in the 2012 movie Zero Dark Thirty, although the character is mentioned by first name only (both within the film and in the cast credits).

In 2010, Bash was named as one of TIME Magazine's 40 Under 40, a list of 40 significant persons under age 40.

Personal life
Bash was married to CNN journalist Dana Bash from 1998 to 2007.

Bash is married to Robyn Bash, Vice President of Government Relations and Public Policy Operations for the American Hospital Association. They have three daughters.

References

External links

1971 births
Living people
People from Arlington County, Virginia
Georgetown University alumni
Harvard Law School alumni
Virginia lawyers
Jewish American attorneys
Lawyers from Washington, D.C.
Obama administration personnel
NBC News people
MSNBC people
Schwartz family (television)